Anabad (also Romanized as Anābad; also known as Anābat, Anār Āb, and Anārbat) is a city and capital of Anabad District, in Bardaskan County, Razavi Khorasan Province, Iran. At the 2006 census, its population was 5,968, in 1,480 families.

See also 

 List of cities, towns and villages in Razavi Khorasan Province

References 

Populated places in Bardaskan County
Cities in Razavi Khorasan Province
Cities in Bardaskan County